Gagged is an extended play (EP) recorded by American drag queen Violet Chachki, released on June 30, 2015, by Sidecar Records and Producer Entertainment Group. It was made available following her crowning as the winner of the seventh season of the reality competition series RuPaul's Drag Race. Chachki was inspired to create the record in order to have her own music and visuals for her performances. Consisting of five dance-pop, electronic, and avant-garde tracks, Gagged was released as a digital EP, and was also made available via streaming services. Its lyrics emphasize sexual fetishism and gender identity, based in part on Chachki's personal experience working as a dominatrix's assistant.

It spawned two singles "Bettie" and "Vanguard", which were promoted through the release of two accompanying music videos. The EP was praised by music critics for its upbeat sound and its single and their music videos; it was noted as a departure from music released by other contestants of RuPaul's Drag Race. In the United States, it charted on the Heatseekers Albums, Independent Albums, and Dance/Electronic Albums Billboard charts.

Background and composition

In an interview with the website GossipGay, Violet Chachki explained that Gagged was intended to build "a full creative experience" for her performances in terms of music and visuals. Chachki said the decision to record music was partially inspired by the way in which American drag queen RuPaul released music to act as "a full package". She attributed the process of creating the extended play (EP) with helping her become more "well rounded". Oscar Raymundo of The Huffington Post wrote that the project reflected Chachki's ambitions to be an "auteur with complete creative control." Chachki also found inspiration in clowns, saying: "I’m a very visual person, and I feel like a clown half the time."

Gagged was mastered by Tom Coyne and produced and mixed by Tomas Costanza. The song "Bettie" was produced by American drummer Tommy Lee. Concerning her working relationship with Lee, Chachki commented: "I'm so honored to even have the opportunity to do it. I've listened to lots of different music that has that same kind of (industrial) feel to it." Chachki described the music as "dark and industrial." The songs were influenced by the work of EDM artists: Purity Ring, Ladytron, Miss Kittin, and The Presets. When discussing her vocal performance on the EP, she described it as "more sexy talking and raspy vocals, dark and fetishy." While promoting the project, Chachki distanced herself from being identified as a singer, and said: "I never set out to be a popstar."

Gagged consists of five dance-pop, electronic, and avant-garde tracks with "thumping" beats. Music critics viewed the EP as a departure from the music released by previous RuPaul's Drag Race contestants, describing its sound as more experimental or moodier. The songs are heavily influenced by sexual fetishism and sadomasochism. Through their lyrics, Chachki addresses "gender roles and conformity, power play, exhibitionism, sex and confidence." She found additional inspiration from her time working as an assistant to a dominatrix and a "mistress in a dungeon." Oscar Raymundo wrote that the EP's title reflected how Chachki is "a fetish queen at heart." The song's titles were noted for their explicitly sexual connotations by Salt Lake City Weeklys Tiffany Frandsen, who described them as "hid[ing] no shame, no secrets."

Release and promotion

On June 30, 2015, Gagged was released as a digital EP. It was also made available via streaming services, such as Amazon Music, Tidal, and Spotify. During an interview with South Florida Gay News, Chachki said that remixes were being created for her songs. She expressed a desire to incorporate the songs as a part of her aerial silk performances.

The EP spawned two singles: "Bettie" and "Vanguard". The lead single "Bettie" was released on June 2, the day after her crowning as the winner of the seventh season of the reality competition series RuPaul's Drag Race. Written by Tommy Lee, the song explores fetish roles, such as "dom versus sub, masculine versus femme", as well as "presentation versus reality." The music video, filmed by director Michael Serrato, was released on June 1. The video explores the theme of a double life, which Chachki said was inspired by Bettie Page's conversion to evangelical Christianity and her retirement from work as a pin-up model. Images of whips, spanking, and boys wearing only underwear, are shown throughout the video.

"Vanguard" was released as the second single on June 30; the music video was uploaded to Chachki's official YouTube account the previous day. The lyrics revolve around protesting bigotry and hatred. Filmed in Los Angeles, the music video was inspired by a negative encounter Chachki had in an Australian McDonald's. In the video, Chachki forms a gang to fight back against a group of homophobic men. It also features scenes of Chachki performing aerial silk acrobatics.

Critical reception 
Gagged was praised by music critics for its sound and composition. Wire Magazine defined it as "the perfect soundtrack to her dark, sexy and daring persona." GossipGay called the EP "refreshing" and "fun", and Stephen Wyatt of Out & About Newspaper wrote that it included "dynamic club tracks that make you want to get up and dance." The EP was described as "fierce and catchy" by Tiffany Frandsen. The website Accidental Bear found it to be a collection of "hard-pounding, dynamic club tracks."

The EP's singles and music videos received positive attention from critics. Frandsen applauded Chachki's confidence as the highlight of the music videos. The music and the accompanying videos were praised by Glamcult and World of Wonder. The release of the EP and the video for "Vanguard" were included in The Advocates list of 7 Things That Are Everything This Week. The single "Bettie" was chosen as an example of the best music released by a RuPaul's Drag Race contestant by the website Pitchfork's Andy Emitt. Emitt praised it for being transgressive, writing that both the song and the video represented "the boldness of the rising generation of queer and trans* artists who eschew comfortably 'safe' representations of sexuality in favor of discomforting the audience they still mean to attract… and arouse."

Commercial performance 
In the United States, Gagged reached a peak position of number 16 on the Heatseekers Albums Billboard chart, and remained on the chart for two weeks. It peaked number 48 on the Independent Albums Billboard Chart, and number 11 on the Dance/Electronic Albums Billboard Chart. It was Chachki's first entry on a Billboard chart, and one of two releases from a RuPaul's Drag Race season seven constant to chart on Billboard. The second was Pearl's album Pleasure, which peaked at number 11 on the Dance/Electronic Albums Billboard chart.

Track listing

Notes
 Track listing and credits from the album's liner notes. Songwriting and production credits for the following songs are unavailable: "Harlequin", "La Petite Mort", "Vanguard", and "Show Off".

Personnel
Credits for Gagged per AllMusic and liner notes.

Management
Producer Entertainment Group LLC

Personnel
Tom Coyne – mastering
Tomas Costanza – producer, mixing
Violet Chachki – primary artist

Charts

Release history

References

External links
Gagged at ProducerEntertainment.com
 

2015 EPs
Dance-pop EPs
Electronic dance music EPs
Producer Entertainment Group albums
Violet Chachki albums